Dana C. Quigley (born April 14, 1947) is an American professional golfer.

Quigley was born in Lynnfield, Massachusetts. He graduated from the University of Rhode Island in 1969 and turned professional in 1971.

Quigley's career in regular tournament golf was unremarkable. He worked as a club professional for many years and had 18 tournament victories in local tournaments in New England. His best finish on the PGA Tour was sixth at the 1980 Greater Milwaukee Open.

In 1997, Quigley became eligible to play in senior golf tournaments, and he soon became a leading player at this level. His first win on the Senior PGA Tour (later called the Champions Tour) came at that year's Northville Long Island Classic. In 2005 at age 58, he led the Champions Tour money list and became the oldest player to win the Arnold Palmer Award for the leading money-winner on the circuit. He has won 11 tournaments on the tour.

Quigley was elected to the New England section of the PGA Hall of Fame in 2000. His nephew Brett Quigley played on the PGA Tour, and now plays on the PGA Tour Champions, where he has won.

Professional wins (32)

Other wins (18)
1973 Rhode Island Open
1981 Rhode Island Open (2)
1982 Massachusetts Open
1983 Massachusetts Open (2), New England Open
1984 Massachusetts Open (3), Maine Open
1985 New England PGA Championship
1986 Vermont Open
1987 Vermont Open (2)
1989 New England PGA Championship (2)
1991 New England PGA Championship (3)
1992 Rhode Island Open (3)
1993 Rhode Island Open (4), New England PGA Championship (4)
1995 Rhode Island Open (5)
1996 Rhode Island Open (6), New England PGA Championship (5)

Champions Tour wins (11)

*Note: The 2005 Bayer Advantage Classic was shortened to 36 holes due to rain.

Champions Tour playoff record (3–5)

Other senior wins (3)
2001 Hyundai Team Matches (with Allen Doyle)
2002 Hyundai Team Matches (with Allen Doyle)
2006 Wendy's Champions Skins Game (with Raymond Floyd)

U.S. national team appearances
UBS Warburg Cup: 2001 (winners)

See also
Fall 1977 PGA Tour Qualifying School graduates
Fall 1978 PGA Tour Qualifying School graduates
List of golfers with most Champions Tour wins

External links

Profile on New England Section of PGA Hall of Fame

American male golfers
PGA Tour golfers
PGA Tour Champions golfers
Golfers from Massachusetts
Golfers from Florida
University of Rhode Island alumni
People from Lynnfield, Massachusetts
Sportspeople from West Palm Beach, Florida
Sportspeople from Essex County, Massachusetts
1947 births
Living people